Carlos Alberto Valderrama Cordero (born November 30, 1977) is a former Venezuelan outfielder in Major League Baseball who appeared in seven games for the San Francisco Giants during the 2003 season.

Born in Maracaibo, Zulia and listed at 6 feet (1.83 m) and 180 pounds (81.7 kg), Valderrama played nine seasons in Minor League Baseball (MiLB). He has a minor league career .298 average with 57 home runs, 334 runs batted in, 427 runs, and 203 stolen bases.

Valderrama is the former manager of the Augusta GreenJackets, the Low-A East affiliate of the Atlanta Braves. He is currently the manager of the Eugene Emeralds, the High-A West affiliate of the San Francisco Giants.

See also
 List of Major League Baseball players from Venezuela

References

Sources
, or Retrosheet, or Pelota Binaria

1977 births
Living people
Águilas del Zulia players
Bakersfield Blaze players
Fresno Grizzlies players
Major League Baseball outfielders
Major League Baseball players from Venezuela
Minor league baseball managers
Norwich Navigators players
Pastora de los Llanos players
Pastora de Occidente players
Salem-Keizer Volcanoes players
San Francisco Giants players
San Jose Giants players
Shreveport Swamp Dragons players
Sportspeople from Maracaibo
Venezuelan expatriate baseball players in the United States